Eupithecia astales is a moth in the family Geometridae. It was described by David Stephen Fletcher in 1978 and it is found in Tanzania.

References

Moths described in 1978
astales
Moths of Africa